HMS Cydnus was one of eight Royal Navy 38-gun Cydnus-class fifth-rates. This frigate was built in 1813 at Blackwall Yard, London, and broken up in 1816.

Design, construction and armament
The entire class was a version of the  frigates, but built of red fir (pine), which was cheaper and more abundant than oak. Most importantly, it permitted noticeably faster construction, but at a cost of reduced durability.

To enable the new frigate to meet the American frigates on less unequal terms, Cydnus, and her sister  received medium 24-pounders and an increased complement of men. Cydnuss 24-pounders were of a design by General Sir Thomas Blomefield, 1st Baronet and measured 7 ft. 6 in. in length while weighing about 40 cwt. The 24-pounders on Eurotas were to a design by Colonel Congreve.

During December 1813 and January 1814, Cyndus and Eurotas actually temporarily exchanged six 24-pounders, presumably to enable both vessels to test the designs against each other. Ultimately, the Royal Navy adopted General Blomefield's design.

Service
Cydnus was commissioned in May 1813 under Captain Frederick W. Aylmer, but command passed later that month to Captain Frederick Langford. On 2 December,  captured Wolfs Cove, while Cydnus and a squadron were in company.

On 8 January 1814, Cydnus recaptured the English ship Rachael and Ann, of 14 guns, 226
tons, and 20 men. She had been sailing from Buenos Aires for London.

On 14 March 1814 Cydnus and Pomone captured the American privateer Bunker's Hill, of 14 guns and 86 men. Though Bunkers Hill had been known for her past successes, on this cruise she was eight days out of Morlaix without having captured anything. Bunkers Hill was the former Royal Navy cutter , which the French frigate Gloire had taken on 25 February 1813 near Madeira. Cydnus carried out convoy duties to the East Indies in 1814.

Cydnus served in the operations against New Orleans in 1814. Her boats participated in the British victory at the Battle of Lake Borgne.

Between 12 and 15 December 1814 Captain Lockyer of Sophie led a flotilla of some 50 boats, barges, gigs, and launches to attack the US gunboats. Lockyer drew his flotilla from the fleet that was massing against New Orleans, including the 74-gun Third Rate ,  Armide, Cydnus, Seahorse, and Meteor.

Lockyer deployed the boats in three divisions, of which he led one.  Captain Montresor of the gun-brig Manly commanded the second, and Captain Roberts of Meteor commanded the third. After rowing for 36 hours, the British met the Americans at St. Joseph's Island. On 13 December 1814, the British attacked the one-gun schooner . On the morning of the 14th, the British engaged the Americans in a short, violent battle.

The British captured the entire American force, including the tender, and five gunboats. The British lost 17 men killed and 77 wounded; Cydnus had four men wounded.  then evacuated the wounded. In 1821 the survivors of the flotilla shared in the distribution of head-money arising from the capture of the American gun-boats and sundry bales of cotton. In 1847 the Admiralty issued a clasp (or bar) marked "14 Dec. Boat Service 1814" to survivors of the boat service who claimed the clasp to the Naval General Service Medal.

On 18 January 1815, Captain the Honourable William Henry Percy faced a court martial on board Cydnus, off Cat Island, Mississippi for the loss of his vessel, during his unsuccessful attack at the Battle of Fort Bowyer in September 1814. The court acquitted him of all blame, finding that the attack was justified.

Langford died early in 1815 at Jamaica. Sir Alexander Cochrane appointed Captain Robert Cavendish Spencer, of the sloop Carron, to command Cydnus in 1815, for his efforts in Louisiana and Florida. Spencer then spent a month camped at Prospect Bluff on the Apalachicola River with Britain's Indian allies, charged with settling their claims and dismissing them from British service. Apparently he left them with some cannons as well. Lieutenant Colonel Edward Nicolls received orders to withdraw his troops from the fort at Prospect Bluff. In accordance with Cochrane's orders, Cydnus was moored off Prospect Bluff, and embarked the Royal Marine detachment on 22 April, arriving at Bermuda on 13 June 1815, to allow the detachment to rejoin the 3rd Battalion as a supernumerary company. Cydnus next sailed to Halifax, arriving on 24 June 1815.

Fate
Cydnus was paid off after she returned to England. The Napoleonic Wars had ended and as she was not durable, she was broken up at Portsmouth in February 1816.

Cydnus was among the ships and vessels under the command of-Admiral Lord Viscount Keith entitled to share in the Parliamentary grant for service in 1813 and 1814.

Notes

Citations

References
 
 Landers, Jane G. (2010). Atlantic Creoles in the Age of Revolutions. Cambridge, Massachusetts: Harvard University Press. 
 Lyon, David & Rif Winfield. 2004. The sail & steam Navy list: all the ships of the Royal Navy, 1815-1889. (London: Chatham).
 
 Monette M. D., John W. 1846. ''History of The Discovery and Settlement of The Valley of the Mississippi, by the Three Great European Powers, Spain, France, and Great Britain, and The subsequent Occupation, Settlement, and Extension of Civil Government by The United States, Until The Year 1846. (New York: Harper and Brothers., 1846), Vol. 1.
 

 

1813 ships
Ships built by the Blackwall Yard
War of 1812 ships of the United Kingdom
Leda-class frigates
Fifth-rate frigates of the Royal Navy